Bucculatrix ptochastis is a moth of the family Bucculatricidae. It is found in Australia. It was first described by Edward Meyrick in 1893.

External links
Australian Faunal Directory

Moths of Australia
Bucculatricidae
Moths described in 1893
Taxa named by Edward Meyrick